Union Presbyterian Church may refer to:

Union Presbyterian Church (Fort Madison, Iowa), a Presbyterian historic site
Union Presbyterian Church (Lost Nation, Iowa), another Presbyterian historic site
 Union Presbyterian Church (Stacyville, Iowa), listed on the National Register of Historic Places (NRHP)
 Union Presbyterian Church (St. Peter, Minnesota), NRHP-listed
 Union Presbyterian Church (Scottsville, New York), NRHP-listed
Union Presbyterian Church & Cemetery, Cowansville, Pennsylvania, another Presbyterian historic site